Mads Pedersen (born 18 December 1995) is a Danish professional racing cyclist, who rides for UCI WorldTeam . In September 2019, he won the men's road race at the 2019 UCI Road World Championships in Yorkshire, England, and became the first Danish cyclist to win the men's World Championship road race title.

Career

In 2013, Pedersen won the Paris–Roubaix Juniors and went on to claim the silver medal in the World Championships junior road race. Pedersen won Ghent–Wevelgem U23, the U23 Tour of Norway, and a stage of the Tour de l'Avenir prior to turning professional.

Trek–Segafredo (2017–present)
In August 2016  announced that they had signed Pedersen through to 2018.

In his neo-pro season, he was named in the start list for the 2017 Giro d'Italia. He also become national champion of Denmark, and took overall victory in the Tour du Poitou Charentes after winning the time trial. In September 2017, Pedersen took overall victory at the Danmark Rundt.

In April 2018, he finished in second place in the Tour of Flanders following a spirited break away. Pedersen attacked ahead of the Koppenberg with just over  remaining, and was joined by Dylan van Baarle and Sebastian Langeveld. Eventual winner Niki Terpstra caught and passed Pedersen on the final ascent of the Oude Kwaremont and rode to victory, but Pedersen was strong enough to hold off world champion Peter Sagan and the chasing peloton to become the youngest podium finisher in 40 years.

On 29 September 2019, Pedersen won the World Road Race Championship in a rain-soaked race, in and around Harrogate, in Yorkshire, England.  He is the first Danish cyclist to win a men's world championship road race title. In August 2020, he was named in the startlist for the 2020 Tour de France. He did not win any stages and held the white jersey for best young rider for one day.

After the Tour was over he won a stage and the points classification in the 2020 BinckBank Tour, and won the 2020 Gent–Wevelgem. Both of these races were held late in the season due to the COVID pandemic. In 2021 he won Kuurne-Brussels-Kuurne and took a stage victory in the Tour of Norway.

In 2022 he won the points classification in Circuit de la Sarthe and Étoile de Bessèges and had top 10 finishes in Milan–San Remo, the Tour of Flanders and Gent–Wevelgem. During the 2022 Tour de France he was very active early in the race as the Grand Depart was held in his home country of Denmark, however he had no luck. At the end of the second week he got involved in a breakaway where he and teammate Quinn Simmons formulated a plan and bridged up to what eventually became a seven rider breakaway. Simmons drove a hard pace up the Coté de Saint-Romain-en-Gal and with just under 11 km to go Pedersen launched an attack. Only Fred Wright and Hugo Houle could go with him. As the finish line approached Pedersen overpowered both of them, and easily won the sprint to claim the stage win.

Career achievements

Major results

2012
 1st  Overall Tour of Istria
1st Young rider classification
1st Stage 3
 1st  Overall Trofeo Karlsberg
1st Young rider classification
1st Stage 3a (ITT)
 1st  Overall Sint-Martinusprijs Kontich
1st  Points classification
1st  Young rider classification
1st Prologue & Stage 4
 10th Paris–Roubaix Juniors
2013
 1st  Overall Course de la Paix Juniors
1st  Points classification
1st Stages 2a (ITT) & 4
 1st  Overall Trofeo Karlsberg
1st Stages 3a (ITT), 3b & 4
 1st Paris–Roubaix Juniors
 Aubel–Thimister–La Gleize
1st  Mountains classification
1st Stage 3
 2nd  Road race, UCI Junior Road World Championships
 2nd Road race, National Junior Road Championships
 2nd Overall Sint-Martinusprijs Kontich
1st Stage 4
 2nd Overall Grand Prix Rüebliland
1st Stage 4
 10th Overall Giro della Lunigiana
1st Stage 4
2014
 1st Eschborn-Frankfurt City Loop U23
 3rd Time trial, National Under-23 Road Championships
2015
 1st Stage 2 Tour de l'Avenir
 2nd Overall ZLM Roompot Tour
1st Stages 2 (TTT) & 3
 6th Overall Four Days of Dunkirk
 6th La Côte Picarde
 8th Overall Tour des Fjords
 9th Ronde van Vlaanderen Beloften
2016
 1st Fyen Rundt
 1st Kattekoers
 Tour of Norway
1st  Mountains classification
1st Stage 3
 7th Poreč Trophy
 8th Overall Three Days of De Panne
1st Young rider classification
2017
 1st  Road race, National Road Championships
 1st  Overall Danmark Rundt
1st  Points classification
1st  Young rider classification
1st Stage 3
 1st  Overall Tour du Poitou-Charentes
1st  Young rider classification
1st Stage 4 (ITT)
2018
 1st Tour de l'Eurométropole
 1st Fyen Rundt
 1st Stage 2 Herald Sun Tour
 1st Stage 4 (ITT) Danmark Rundt
 2nd Tour of Flanders
 5th Dwars door Vlaanderen
 7th GP Horsens
2019
 1st  Road race, UCI Road World Championships
 1st Grand Prix d'Isbergues
2020
 1st Gent–Wevelgem
 1st Stage 2 Tour de Pologne
 4th Road race, National Road Championships
 5th Overall BinckBank Tour
1st  Points classification
1st Stage 3
 7th Race Torquay
 Tour de France
Held  after Stage 1
2021
 1st Kuurne–Brussels–Kuurne
 1st Stage 3 Tour of Norway
 2nd Overall Danmark Rundt
1st  Points classification
1st Stage 2
 2nd Bredene Koksijde Classic
 3rd Eurométropole Tour
2022
 1st Fyen Rundt
 Vuelta a España
1st  Points classification
1st Stages 13, 16 & 19
 Tour de France
1st Stage 13
 Combativity award Stage 13
 Circuit de la Sarthe
1st  Points classification
1st Stages 1 & 3
 Étoile de Bessèges
1st  Points classification
1st Stage 1
 1st Stage 3 Paris–Nice
 National Road Championships
2nd Road race
4th Time trial
 2nd Grand Prix La Marseillaise
 3rd GP Herning
 6th Milan–San Remo
 7th Overall Tour of Belgium
1st  Points classification
1st Stage 1
 7th Gent–Wevelgem
 8th Tour of Flanders
 10th Road race, UEC European Road Championships
2023
 1st Stage 2 Paris–Nice
 1st Stage 5 (ITT) Étoile de Bessèges
 6th Milan–San Remo

Grand Tour general classification results timeline

Classics results timeline

Major championships timeline

References

External links
 

1995 births
Danish Tour de France stage winners
Danish Vuelta a España stage winners
Danish male cyclists
Danmark Rundt winners
Living people
Place of birth missing (living people)
Sportspeople from Aarhus
UCI Road World Champions (elite men)